Morondava District is a district in the Menabe region in eastern Madagascar. Its capital is Morondava.

Communes
The district is further divided into five communes:

 Analaiva
 Befasy
 Belo sur Mer
 Bemanonga
 Morondava

Roads
 RN 34 to Ivato, Ambositra and Antsirabe.
 RN 8 to Belo-sur-Tsiribihina.

Airports
Morondava Airport

Rivers
Morondava River

Nature
Tsingy de Bemaraha Strict Nature Reserve
Andranomena Reserve
Kirindy Forest

Religion
Roman Catholic Diocese (Cathedral of Mary Queen of the World).
 Fiangonana Jesosy Mamonjy Morondava
 FJKM - Fiangonan'i Jesoa Kristy eto Madagasikara (Church of Jesus Christ in Madagascar)

References

Districts of Menabe